The Mix is a remix album by Gary Numan released in the US exclusively by Cleopatra Records and containing specially commissioned remixes by several established artists.

Track listing 
 "Are 'Friends' Electric?" (Leather Strip Mix) – 4:59
 "Cars" (Spahn Ranch Mix) – 4:52
 "We Are So Fragile" (Death Ride 69 Mix) – 4:35
 "We Are Glass" (Transmutator Mix) – 4:51
 "A Question of Faith" (Anubian Lights Mix) – 5:00
 "I Die: You Die" (Information Society Mix) – 3:52
 "Cars" (Talla 2XLC Mix) – 4:53
 "We Are Glass" (Astralasia Mix) – 5:02
 "Deadliner" (Spaceship Eyes Mix) – 4:09
 "Cars" (JLAB Mix) – 4:01
 "Emotion" (Kill Switch...Klick Mix) – 4:59
 "She's Got Claws" (Biokraft Mix) – 4:42
 "Are 'Friends' Electric?" (Ikon Mix) – 4:43
 "We Are So Fragile" (LCD Mix) – 4:58

 "Cars" (Talla 2XLC Mix) previously appeared in a slightly longer form on the Techno Army featuring Gary Numan remix album.

Personnel 
 1 Remixed by Claus Larsen at Strip Farm, Denmark.
 2 Remixed by Matt Green at Tensegrity, Los Angeles, CA.
 3 Remixed by Mark Blasquez at Sci-Borg Studio, Los Angeles, CA.
 4 Remixed by Romell Regulacion at Ewa Beach, Hawaii.
 5 Remixed by Tommy Johnston & Len Del Rio at Brain Squid, Los Angeles, CA.
 6 Remixed and additional vocals by Kurt Harland in San Francisco, CA.
 7 Remixed by Talla 2XLC at Music Research, Bad Homburg, Germany.
 8 Remixed by Swordfish, Berkshire, UK.
 9 Remixed by Don Falcone, San Francisco, CA.
 10 Remixed by Judson Leach at JLAB, Los Angeles, CA.
 11 Remixed by DA Sebastian at the Shop, Seattle, WA.
 12 Remixed by Biokraft at Kiss my Fist, New Orleans, LA. Engineered by El En, Melbourne, Australia.
 13 Remixed by Chris McCarter, mastered by Tony Man at Jack the Bear, Melbourne, Australia.
 14 Remixed by Roc Robbie at The Bunker, Sweden.

References 

1998 remix albums
Gary Numan remix albums
Cleopatra Records remix albums